Tulosesus bisporiger is a species of mushroom producing fungus in the family Psathyrellaceae.

Taxonomy 
It was first described by the English mycologist Peter Darbishire Orton in 1976 and placed in the Coprinus genus.

In 2001 a phylogenetic study resulted in a major reorganization and reshuffling of that genus and this species was transferred to Coprinellus.

The species was known as Coprinellus bisporiger until 2020 when the German mycologists Dieter Wächter & Andreas Melzer reclassified many species in the Psathyrellaceae family based on phylogenetic analysis.

References

bisporiger
Fungi described in 1976
Tulosesus